Rhynchaglaea is a genus of moths of the family Noctuidae.

Species
 Rhynchaglaea fuscipennis Sugi, 1958
 Rhynchaglaea hemixantha Sugi, 1980
 Rhynchaglaea leuteomixta Hreblay & Ronkay, 1998
 Rhynchaglaea perscitula Kobayashi & Owada, 2006
 Rhynchaglaea scitula (Butler, 1879)
 Rhynchaglaea taiwana Sugi, 1980
 Rhynchaglaea terngjyi Chang, 1991

References
Natural History Museum Lepidoptera genus database
Rhynchaglaea at funet

Cuculliinae